Whitecourt was a provincial electoral district in Alberta, Canada mandated to return a single member to the Legislative Assembly of Alberta using first-past-the-post balloting from 1971 to 1993.

Boundary history

The district replaced Lac Ste. Anne for the 1971 election, with only minor boundary changes from the previous district. Its boundaries again remained mostly unchanged when replaced by Whitecourt-Ste. Anne in 1993, although the area around Fox Creek was transferred to Grande Prairie-Smoky.

Representation history
The district's only MLA was Progressive Conservative Peter Trynchy. He entered the Legislature upon winning the seat in the 1971 election and served eight terms all together, six as MLA for Whitecourt and two in Whitecourt-Ste. Anne, finally retiring in 2001.

Election results

1970s

1980s
The 1982 election saw the rise of the separatist Western Canada Concept, which failed to win any seats. Their result in Whitecourt was the fourth-best in the province, despite Social Credit candidate George Richardson's status as party leader. Trynchy still won an outright majority of votes, benefitting from a surge in turnout.

Representative Party swing in 1986 is calculated from Social Credit results in 1982.

See also
List of Alberta provincial electoral districts

References

Further reading

External links
Elections Alberta
The Legislative Assembly of Alberta

Former provincial electoral districts of Alberta